Storm is a 2005 Swedish fantasy-thriller film directed by Måns Mårlind and Björn Stein. The film stars Eric Ericson, Eva Röse and Jonas Karlsson. The official opening of Storm was on 20 January 2006, but the actual opening was at a preview of the film on 18 November 2005 during the Stockholm Film Festival, where it also was awarded. Before 2006, Storm had already been sold to 18 other countries.

Plot
Slacker Donny's (Eric Ericson) life is turned upside-down when Lova (Eva Rose) enters his life possessing a mysterious box which may hold answers to eternal and dangerous questions. But evil forces want to possess the box, and Donny and Lova must travel through time to ensure the future of mankind.

Production
The film was shot in Stockholm, Vänersborg (as the abandoned city) and in Trollhättan, a.k.a. Trollywood.

Reception
Steve Pattee from "horrortalk.com" blamed the film for having a "less than satisfactory" ending, but he gave three out of five stars. A blogger named Cyrus also spoke of a "less than satisfying ending" because there was possibly "a bit too much" left for the viewer to ponder. Bill Gribon from "dvdtalk.com" appreciated "Storm" as "fascinating food for thought".

References

External links

 
 

2005 films
Films directed by Måns Mårlind
Films directed by Björn Stein
2000s Swedish-language films
Swedish fantasy thriller films
2005 directorial debut films
2000s fantasy thriller films
2000s Swedish films